Cymbidium is a brachiopod genus in the order Pentamerida from Silurian Alaska, from the Cape Phillips Formation from Baillie-Hamilton Island, Arctic Canada and Malaya.

See also 
 List of brachiopod genera

References

External links 
 Cymbidium on paleodb.org

Prehistoric brachiopod genera
Silurian brachiopods
Fossils of Canada
Paleontology in Nunavut